Asif Akbar (born 25 March 1972) is a Bangladeshi pop singer. He releases solo, duet, and mixed albums and also songs for Bangladeshi cinema. His latest album, Jaan Re, is available online after he released all of his songs in all methods to prevent piracy. He received the Meril Prothom Alo Award for Best Singer (Male) for five consecutive years and the Bangladesh National Film Award for Best Male Playback Singer for his performance in the film Rani Kuthir Baki Itihash (2006).

Background
Akbar was born to Ali Akbar and Rokeya Akbar in Comilla. He did his SSC from Comilla Zilla School in 1989 and HSC from Comilla Victoria Government College in 1991.

Career
Music director Shawkat Ali Emon gave Akbar the first break, and he started performing as a playback singer for films since 1998. Akbar made his break with the track "O Priya Tumi Kothay". His debut album was released on 30 January 2001. He consistently releases solo albums and also duets with singers such as Kavita Krishnamurthy, Kumar Sanu, Bappa Mazumder, Doly Shaontoni, Suzana Ansar, Sonia, Kaniz Suborna, Dinat Jahan Munni, Monir Khan, and many others. He temporarily retired from commercial singing on 17 March 2010 to concentrate on his political career but returned to the Bangladeshi music scene with his solo album titled X Prem released in August 2013.

Akbar received the Meril Prothom Alo Award for Best Singer (Male) for five consecutive years from 2001 through 2005, the Bangladesh National Film Award for Best Male Playback Singer for 2006, and for 2013, a record sixth Meril Prothom Alo Award for the performance of his song "X Prem".

Personal life
Akbar is married to Salma Asif Mitu. He was a member of Bangladesh National Party's central executive committee until resigning in 2011.

Controversy
In June 2018, singer Shafiq Tuhin accused Akbar of selling out digital copies of several songs without permission and filed a case against him with Tejgaon Police Station. Akbar was arrested on 6 June from his studio in the FDC area in Dhaka. Later, a Dhaka court rejected both the remand and bail prayers and ordered to send him to jail. After spending 5 days in jail, Dhaka Additional Chief Metropolitan Magistrate granted him bail.

Discography

Solo albums

Duet and mixed albums

Film songs

References

External links
 
 
 

Living people
1972 births
People from Comilla
Comilla Victoria Government College alumni
21st-century Bangladeshi male singers
21st-century Bangladeshi singers
Bangladeshi pop singers
Best Male Playback Singer National Film Award (Bangladesh) winners
Best Male Singer Meril-Prothom Alo Award winners